Holy Buckeye is the nickname given to one of the most famous plays in the history of Ohio State football.  It occurred in a late-regular season game between the Ohio State Buckeyes and the Purdue Boilermakers at Ross–Ade Stadium in West Lafayette, Indiana, on November 9, 2002.

The play was a critical point for the 2002 Ohio State Buckeyes football team, as an incomplete pass (or a failed first-down conversion) would have likely resulted in a loss to Purdue, which in turn, would have almost certainly removed Ohio State from national championship contention.  The nickname "Holy Buckeye" is a play on other similar expressions (e.g., "holy cow", "holy mackerel", etc.) and came from Brent Musburger, the ABC television play-by-play announcer, who exclaimed the phrase as the completion was made.

Events of the play

Ohio State, which had been struggling on offense for the entire game, found itself with a 3rd and 14 at the 50-yard line, trailing Purdue by a score of 6–3 with 2:26 remaining in the game.  After completing a 13-yard pass to Ben Hartsock on the left sideline, Ohio State had a 4th and 1 to go.  Rather than have the kicker Mike Nugent attempt a long field goal to tie, or call a running play for tailback Lydell Ross to gain the necessary yardage to avoid a turnover on downs (star running back Maurice Clarett was injured and could not play), Jim Tressel called the "King Right 64 Y Shallow Swap" - a pass.  With the game clock still running from the previous play, the ball was snapped with just 1:44 left, and after dropping back, quarterback Craig Krenzel stepped up into the pocket and threw a 37-yard pass down the left sideline, which was caught by Michael Jenkins in the endzone to score the winning touchdown.

Quotes

Game summary

Scoring summary

Game statistics

Aftermath
The Buckeyes moved to 11–0 with the victory and kept their national championship hopes alive. After two straight close wins against Illinois and Michigan, Ohio State won the Fiesta Bowl against the Miami Hurricanes to win the national championship and complete a 14–0 season. Purdue fell to 4–6 with the loss, but rebounded to win their final games of the regular season and received an invitation to the Sun Bowl, which they won 34–24 over Washington to finish the season 7–6.

References

2002 Big Ten Conference football season
Ohio State Buckeyes football games
Purdue Boilermakers football games
American football incidents
November 2002 sports events in the United States
2002 in sports in Indiana